The Moon Looked Down and Laughed is the second and final studio album by the Irish rock band Virgin Prunes. It was released in July 1986 by Baby Records in Europe, and on Touch and Go Records in the U.S.

Track listing

Personnel 

Virgin Prunes
 Dave-iD Busaras – vocals
 Mary D'Nellon – guitar
 Gavin Friday – vocals
 Pod – drums
 Strongman – bass guitar

Technical personnel
 Dave Ball – production
 Flood – engineering
 Dave Meegan – mixing, engineering
 Ted Sharp – engineering

Charts

Release history

References

External links 
 

1986 albums
Virgin Prunes albums
Touch and Go Records albums
Albums recorded at Trident Studios